Dalibor Višković (born 6 January 1977) is a Croatian football manager and former professional player who played as a defender. He also holds Italian citizenship.

Club career
On 1 February 2010, the former Vicenza player was signed by Sambonifacese.

International career
Višković has capped for Croatia B against France B on 19 January 1999and played at 2000 U21 EURO.

Career statistics

Honours

Manager
NK Buje
 Istrian Super Cup: 2019
 Istrian Football Cup: 2018–19

References

External links
 
 https://www.istrasport.eu/medulinci-nisu-uspjeli-previse-parirati-bujezi-lakse-od-ocekivanog-do-superkupa-istre/
 https://www.glasistre.hr/sport/prvi-trofej-sezone-buje-deklasirale-medulince-595770
 https://www.istrasport.eu/buje-kroz-rulet-jedanaesteraca-do-kupa-istre/
 http://glasistre.hr/sport/osvajanje-kupa-istre-kruna-je-uspjesne-sezone-590198
 http://sport.repubblica.it/news/sport/calcio-vicenza-arrivano-zancope-viskovic-ceduto-fabbrini/1736120
 Profile at La Gazzetta dello Sport 

1977 births
Living people
Footballers from Rijeka
Sportspeople from Koper
People with acquired Italian citizenship
Association football defenders
Croatian footballers
Croatia youth international footballers
Croatia under-21 international footballers
HNK Rijeka players
NK Slaven Belupo players
Hapoel Petah Tikva F.C. players
L.R. Vicenza players
FC DAC 1904 Dunajská Streda players
NK Pomorac 1921 players
A.C. Sambonifacese players
NK Novigrad players
Croatian Football League players
Israeli Premier League players
Serie B players
First Football League (Croatia) players
Serie C players
Serie D players
Second Football League (Croatia) players
Croatian expatriate footballers
Expatriate footballers in Israel
Expatriate footballers in Italy
Expatriate footballers in Slovakia
Croatian expatriate sportspeople in Israel
Croatian expatriate sportspeople in Italy
Croatian expatriate sportspeople in Slovakia
Croatian football managers